Chicha is a village of Faisalabad District in the Punjab province of Pakistan. It is part of Iqbal town and is one of the villages under Chak 254. These villages are situated on Sammundari road and Chicha village is exactly 18 km away from the main Faisalabad city. There are only few hundred people living in Chicha.

References

Villages in Faisalabad District